Federal Medical Centre, Gombe now Federal Teaching Hospital, Gombe is a federal government of Nigeria medical centre located in Gombe, Gombe State, Nigeria. The current chief medical director is Dr. Yusuf Abdullahi.



History 
Federal Medical Centre, Gombe was established in 1996.

CMD 
The current chief medical director is Dr Yusuf Abdullahi succeeded the late Dr Yahaya Saidu Alkali.

References 

Hospitals in Nigeria